This is a list of traditional specialties guaranteed by country. Traditional specialities guaranteed (TSGs, singular traditional speciality guaranteed) are traditional food products protected under EU and/or UK law. This label differs from the geographical indications protected designation of origin (PDO) and protected geographical indication (PGI) in that the TSG quality scheme does not certify that the protected food product has a link to a specific geographical area, and thus a TSG product can be produced outside the area or country from which it originates. To qualify for the TSG label, a food product must be of "specific character" and its raw materials, production method, or processing must be "traditional".

All EU TSG registered before 1 January 2021 are also valid in the UK. The EU publishes its designations in the TSG database, and the UK in its TSG register. As of 28 January 2023, 58 names were registered under UK law and 63 under EU law.

Multiple countries

Austria

Belgium

Bulgaria

Czechia

Finland

France

Hungary

Italy

Latvia

Lithuania

Netherlands

Poland

Portugal

Romania

Spain

Slovakia

Slovenia

Sweden

United Kingdom

Former TSG's
Seven TSG's were registered under earlier TSG-regulations, but were not continued to the present scheme. Their validity ended on 4 January 2023.

See also
List of PDO products by country

References

Country of origin
European Union food law
Food product brands
Geographical indications
Traditional Speciality Guaranteed